Grandes Éxitos (English: "Greatest Hits") is a greatest hits album by Mexican singer Luis Miguel. Released on 22 November 2005 by Warner Music Latina, the album features 24 previously-recorded songs from Miguel's career with his record label as well as two new songs ("Misterios del Amor" and "Si Te Perdiera"); both songs were released as singles from the album. A special edition of the record was also released and features six extra songs as well as a DVD containing music videos from Miguel's career. Grandes Éxitos received a favorable review by AllMusic critic, Thom Jurek who commended Miguel's trajectory as an artist. Commercially, it reached number one in Mexico and the top ten in Argentina, Spain, Portugal, and the Billboard Top Latin Albums chart in the United States. It was certified Multi-Platinum in Mexico and the United States (Latin) and Platinum in Spain.

Background and content
On 15 October 2005, Luis Miguel announced that he was releasing a greatest hits album on 22 November 2005. The contains 24 previously-recorded songs from his music career, ranging from pop music, boleros from his Romance series, and mariachi. The set includes tracks he recorded under his label Warner Music Latina since 1987. A special edition of the album was also released on 22 November and features six extra songs, as well as a DVD of his music videos.

Two original songs were composed for Grandes Éxitos: "Misterios del Amor" and "Si Te Perdiera". The former song was composed by Francisco Loyo and Alejandro Asensi while the latter track was written by Manuel Alejandro; both songs were produced by Miguel. "Misterios del Amor" was released as the album's lead single on 24 October 2005 and peaked at number 29 on the Billboard Hot Latin Songs chart in the United States. "Si Te Perdiera" was released as the album's second single on 17 January 2006 and peaked at number 47 on the Hot Latin Songs chart. "Si Te Perdiera" served as the main theme for the Mexican telenovela La verdad oculta (2006).

Reception
AllMusic critic Thom Jurek gave Grandes Éxitos four-out-of-five stars noting Miguel's maturity from a teen idol into crooner. He commented some of the songs sounds "dated" but remarked that Miguel's trajectory as "utterly engaging and worthwhile". In the United States, Grandes Éxitos peaked at number eight on the Billboard Top Latin Albums chart and was certified double platinum in the Latin field by the Recording Industry Association of America for shipping 200,000 copies. In Mexico, the double-disc reached the top of the Top 100 Mexico albums chart and was certified quadruple platinum by the Asociación Mexicana de Productores de Fonogramas y Videogramas (AMPROFON) for shipping 400,000 units. The DVD was certified double platinum by AMPROFON as well for shipments of 40,000 units. In Argentina, it peaked at number three on the albums chart. In Europe, the record peaked at number five in Spain and was certified platinum by the Productores de Música de España and reached seven in Portugal.

Track listing

Charts

Weekly charts

Year-end charts

Certifications

Album

Video

Personnel
Adapted from the Grandes Éxitos liner notes:

"Misterios del Amor"
Luis Miguel – producer, vocals
Rafa Sardina – recording engineer
David Reitzas – audio mixing
Ron McMaster – mastering

"Si Te Perdiera"
Luis Miguel – producer, vocals
Rafa Sardina – recording engineer, audio mixing
Ron McMaster – mastering

References

2005 greatest hits albums
2005 video albums
Luis Miguel compilation albums
Luis Miguel video albums
Music video compilation albums
Spanish-language compilation albums
Spanish-language video albums
Warner Music Latina compilation albums
Warner Music Latina video albums